Sir Donald Macmaster, 1st Baronet,  (3 September 1846 – 3 March 1922) was a Canadian lawyer and a politician in both Canada and the United Kingdom.

Macmaster was born into a family of Scottish descent in Williamstown, Glengarry County, Canada West (now in eastern Ontario). He studied law at McGill University, was called to the Quebec bar in 1871, and set up practice in Montreal. Macmaster served as Crown Prosecutor for many cases. He was called to the Ontario bar and appointed Queen's Counsel in 1882.

He represented Glengarry in the Legislative Assembly of Ontario from 1879 to 1882 and in the House of Commons of Canada as a Conservative member from 1883 to 1887, when he lost his seat.

In 1905, Macmaster emigrated to the United Kingdom and settled in London, intending to practise in Privy Council cases, in which he already had considerable experience. In 1910 he was elected to the House of Commons as Conservative member for the Chertsey division of Surrey, holding the seat until his death. He was created a baronet in the 1921 New Year Honours.

In 1880, he married Janet Macdonald, who died less than three years later. In 1890 he married the American Ella Virginia DeFord. Their only son, Donald, was killed in action at the Battle of Loos while commanding a company of the Cameron Highlanders on 25 September 1915.

Footnotes

References
Obituary, The Times, 4 March 1922

External links 

The Canadian parliamentary companion, 1883 JA Gemmill
The Canadian men and women of the time : a handbook of Canadian biography HJ Morgan (1898)

1846 births
1922 deaths
People from the United Counties of Stormont, Dundas and Glengarry
Canadian people of Scottish descent
McGill University Faculty of Law alumni
Lawyers in Ontario
Lawyers in Quebec
Progressive Conservative Party of Ontario MPPs
Conservative Party of Canada (1867–1942) MPs
Members of the House of Commons of Canada from Ontario
Canadian emigrants to England
Conservative Party (UK) MPs for English constituencies
UK MPs 1910
UK MPs 1910–1918
UK MPs 1918–1922
Baronets in the Baronetage of the United Kingdom
Canadian King's Counsel